Aristidh Parapani (1926–1979) was a former Albanian footballer who played for Sportklub Tiranë and Partizani Tirana as well as the Albania national team. In total, he earned 18 caps for the nation team between 1946 and 1952.

International career
He made his debut for Albania in an October 1946 Balkan Cup match against Yugoslavia, which was Albania's first official match. He earned a total of 18 caps, scoring 1 goal. His final international was a December 1952 friendly match against Czechoslovakia.

Honours
Albanian Superliga: 3
 1948, 1949, 1954.

References

External links

1926 births
1979 deaths
Footballers from Tirana
Albanian footballers
Association football midfielders
Albania international footballers
KF Tirana players
FK Partizani Tirana players
Kategoria Superiore players